The northern shriketit (Falcunculus whitei) is a species of bird in the family Falcunculidae.
It is found in the Kimberley region of north-western Australia and the Top End of the Northern Territory.

References

Falcunculus
Birds described in 1910